Kham Yat Palace is a historic palace in Thailand, located in the area of abandoned temple, Wat Pho Thong (วัดโพธิ์ทอง), Kham Yat Subdistrict, Pho Thong District, Ang Thong Province in the central region.

It was built by King Borommakot, the 32nd monarch of the Ayutthaya Kingdom, to serve as his lodge while vacation and hunting at Wiset Chai Chan (province of Ang Thong at that time).

This palace hall used to be the abode of King Uthumphon, son of Borommakot, while he was ordained as a monk. Where he stayed for a period of time before returning to stay at Wat Pradu Songtham in Ayutthaya.

It was registered as an ancient monument in Thailand by the Fine Arts Department, and is considered another tourist attraction of Ang Thong. 

On certain days of the late year (around 21–22 December which falls on winter solstice), the rays of the downing sun passing through all doorways of the palace hall, a natural phenomenon similar to the case of Phanom Rung Historical Park in Buriram Province.

References

Former royal residences in Thailand
Buildings and structures in Ang Thong province
Tourist attractions in Ang Thong province